National Pie Day is a celebration of pies that occurs annually in the United States on January 23. It started in the mid-1970s by Boulder, Colorado nuclear engineer, brewer and teacher Charlie Papazian after he declared his own birthday, January 23, to be National Pie Day. Since 1986, National Pie Day is sponsored by the American Pie Council.

In 2014, the American Pie Council partnered with Paramount Pictures in promoting the romantic thriller film Labor Day in conjunction with National Pie Day. (A pie-making scene features prominently in the film, and the film's general release was within a few days of National Pie Day.)

The APC distributed a promotional poster to pie shops and bakeries featuring images of the film's stars Kate Winslet, Josh Brolin, and Gattlin Griffith in the pie-making scene. New York Post writer Lou Lumenick noted dryly that the scene was an "eccentric choice for a promotion" since Brolin's character is an escaped murderer and "before they all make pies together, he abducts them from a supermarket and ties both of them up... A bond does emerge between Brolin and his hostages before he surrenders to police. But still." The poster is captioned in part "It makes the time we spend together, just a little sweeter. Pie. Grab a slice of life."

Notwithstanding any problematic overtones, though, Variety'''s take on the scene was "What damage [the 1999 film] American Pie did for the pie industry, Labor Day'' has reversed."

See also
 List of food days
British Pie Week, 4-10 March

References

External links
The American Pie Council Official website

January observances
Unofficial observances
Observances about food and drink